Sobel is a surname.

Sobel may also refer to:

 Sobel (Sierra Leone), term describing Sierra Leone Army soldiers that allied with enemy rebels to loot civilians during the Sierra Leone Civil War
 Sobel operator, used in digital image processing, particularly within edge detection algorithms
 Sobel test, in statistics
 Sobell (disambiguation)
 Sobol (disambiguation)

See also